Rachel Cox (born 1984) is an American photographer. Cox is based in Iowa City, Iowa.

In her project Shiny Ghost, she photographically documented her relationship to her dying grandmother. Her project Mors Scena had as its subject the physical spaces used to grieve deaths in the United States.

Cox's work is held in the collections of the Museum of Contemporary Photography, Chicago and the Museum of Fine Arts Houston.

References

External links

Living people
1984 births
20th-century American photographers
21st-century American photographers
20th-century American women artists
21st-century American women artists
Artists from Iowa
American women photographers